This is a list of notable graduates of Rider University (formerly Rider College) in Lawrenceville, New Jersey.

Notable alumni

Business

Carol Meyrowitz, CEO of TJX Companies 
Robert Miller, Canadian billionaire who founded Future Electronics
Kenneth Yen, CEO of China Motor Corporation and Yulon

Government
Antonio Arocho, attorney and former chief operating officer of the Hispanic National Bar Association 
Milton Nathaniel Barnes, Liberian Ambassador to the United Nations 
Jack Casey, member of the New Jersey Senate and General Assembly
Robert D. Clifton, member of the New Jersey General Assembly
John F. Cordisco, former member of the Pennsylvania House of Representatives
Frederick W. Donnelly, former Mayor of Trenton, New Jersey
Eldridge Hawkins, Jr., Mayor of Orange, New Jersey
Valerie Huttle, Democrat who serves in the New Jersey General Assembly where she represents the 37th Legislative District
Robert E. Grossman, Judge on the U.S. Bankruptcy Court for the Eastern District of New York
Vincent Ignizio, member of New York City Council; former member of New York State Assembly
Peter Inverso, former member of the New Jersey State Senate
Marvin Keller, Pennsylvania State Representative and Senator
Edward von Kloberg III, infamous lobbyist
Paul Kramer, member of the New Jersey General Assembly
James J. McCullough, former member of the New Jersey State Senate
Connie Myers, MA, former member of the New Jersey General Assembly
Joseph A. Palaia, Monmouth County Freeholder, former member of the New Jersey General Assembly and New Jersey State Senate
Michael T. Peifer, member of the Pennsylvania House of Representatives
David Rousseau, MBA, former New Jersey State Treasurer during Jon Corzine Administration
Mark S. Schweiker, MA, 44th Governor of Pennsylvania
Shirley Turner, MA, member & president pro tempore of the New Jersey State Senate

Sports

Baseball
Jack Armstrong, former Major League Baseball pitcher; 1990 MLB All-Star and World Champion
Kevin Barry, former Major League Baseball pitcher
Al Downing, former Major League Baseball pitcher; 1967 MLB All-Star & Strikeout Champion; 1971 MLB Comeback Player of the Year
Jim Hoey, former Major League Baseball relief pitcher
Jeff Kunkel, former Major League Baseball player; 3rd pick of the 1983 MLB Draft by the Texas Rangers
Nick Margevicius, Major League Baseball pitcher for the Seattle Mariners
Danny Napoleon, former Major League Baseball outfielder

Basketball
Dick Kuchen, former head basketball coach at Yale University and the University of California
Digger Phelps, former Notre Dame Fighting Irish basketball coach; ESPN analyst
Jason Thompson, former National Basketball Association power forward/center; 12th pick in the 2008 NBA Draft; current player with Fenerbahçe

Soccer
Jim McKeown, retired American soccer defender who played in the North American Soccer League.
Bobby Smith, National Soccer Hall of Fame member; former NASL and U.S. National defender
Florian Valot, current midfielder for New York Red Bulls
Jose Aguinaga, current midfielder for El Paso Locomotive

Other sports
Nick Catone, Male Athlete of the Year (2004); retired professional MMA fighter formerly competing in the UFC's Middleweight Division
Jazmine Fenlator, Female Athlete of the Year (2006 and 2007); U.S. Olympic bobsled pilot at 2014 Winter Olympics at Sochi, now competes for her father's Jamaica National Team
Caroline Lind, MBA, Olympic Gold Medal rower at the 2008 Summer Olympics in Beijing
Carmelo Marrero, wrestler; professional mixed martial arts fighter

Media & Entertainment
David Bird, financial journalist 
John Bundy, magician with two appearances on the Late Show with David Letterman
 Matt Cook (born 1984, class of 2002), actor known mostly for his roles as Mo McCracken on the TBS sitcom Clipped and most recently as Lowell in the CBS sitcom Man with a Plan.
William Mastrosimone, playwright
James Morgart, horror film director, producer, screenwriter, actor, and critic
Roberta Naas, journalist
Joanne Nosuchinsky, actress (summa cum laude) - The Awesome 80s Prom (Off Broadway), Miss New York USA 2013, Fox News Channel contributor, former occasional fill-in host for the network's overnight Red eye program and contributor to Sunday night's, The Greg Gutfeld Show, on Fox
Tom Papa, comedian and host of NBC's The Marriage Ref
Barbara Park, author of children's books 
Gerald Peary, American film critic, who has been a reviewer and columnist for the Boston Phoenix since 1996. Former Acting Curator of the Harvard Film Archive

Other
Arthur Katalayi, MA, senior adviser and global ambassador at Giving Back to Africa

Notable faculty
Sally Brophy (1928–2007), television actor of the 1950s and 1960s, instructed theater arts at Rider for two decades. She was a graduate of the Royal Academy in London, England.
Jack Sullivan, American literary scholar, essayist, author, editor, musicologist, and short story writer.

References

Lists of people by university or college in New Jersey